= Motivating language theory =

Academic communication theory

Motivating language theory (ML) is an academic theory within the broader field of communication. The theory was originally proposed by J. Sullivan in 1988 as a framework for studying effective communication from leaders to followers. There are three types of languages used in leader communication: direction-giving, emotion-sharing, and meaning-making. Sullivan suggests that the most effective leaders combine all three language types in their communication.

ML and its effectiveness have been studied in business, education, government, religion and other fields. It has also been studied across different cultures.
